The Congressional Arts Caucus is a registered Congressional Member Organization for the US House of Representatives in the 115th Congress.

History

The Congressional Arts Caucus was created in the 1980s as a way for the various members of Congress interested in the arts to be able to influence art legislation and to promote the National Endowment for the Arts.

Members
As of the 117th Congress, the Congressional Arts Caucus has 120 members (106 Democrats, 14 Republicans).
The members are listed by state:

Terri Sewell (AL-07)
Ruben Gallego (AZ-7)
Raul Grijalva  (AZ-3)
French Hill (AR-2)
Julia Brownley (CA-26)
Tony Cardenas (CA-29)
Lou Correa (CA-46)
Anna Eshoo (CA-18)
Jared Huffman (CA-2)
Barbara Lee (CA-13)
Ted Lieu (CA-33)
Zoe Lofgren (CA-19)
Alan Lowenthal (CA-47) Retiring at end of current Congress.
Doris Matsui (CA-6)
Tom McClintock (CA-4)
Grace Napolitano (CA-32)
Jimmy Panetta (CA-20)
Scott Peters (CA-52)
Lucille Roybal-Allard (CA-40) Retiring at end of current Congress.
Linda Sanchez (CA-38)
Adam Schiff  (CA-28)
Brad Sherman (CA-30)
Jackie Speier (CA-14) Retiring at end of current Congress.
Mark Takano (CA-41)
Mike Thompson (CA-5)
Diana DeGette (CO-1)
Joe Courtney (CT-2)
Rosa DeLauro (CT-3)
Jim Himes  (CT-4)
John Larson (CT-1)
Lisa Blunt Rochester (DE-At Large)
Eleanor Holmes Norton (DC-At Large)
Vern Buchanan (FL-16)
Kathy Castor (FL-14)
Ted Deutch (FL-21) Retiring at end of current Congress.
Lois Frankel (FL-22)
Bill Posey (FL-8)
Debbie Wasserman Schultz (FL-23)
Frederica Wilson (FL-24)
Hank Johnson (GA-4)
Michael Simpson (ID-2)
Danny Davis (IL-7)
Bill Foster (IL-11)
Raja Krishnamoorthi (IL-8)
Mike Quigley (IL-5)
Jan Schakowsky (IL-9)
André Carson (IN-7)
Brett Guthrie (KY-2)
John Yarmuth (KY-3) Retiring at end of current Congress.
Jared Golden (ME-2)
Chellie Pingree (ME-1)
John Sarbanes (MD-3)
Bill Keating (MA-9)
Stephen Lynch (MA-8)
James McGovern (MA-2)
Seth Moulton (MA-06)
Richard Neal (MA-1)
Ayanna Pressley (MA-7)
Debbie Dingell (MI-12)
Brenda Lawrence (MI-14) Retiring at end of current Congress.
Haley Stevens (MI-11)
Fred Upton (MI-6) Retiring at end of current Congress.
Betty McCollum (MN-4)
Dean Phillips (MN-3)
Billy Long (MO-7) Retiring at end of current Congress.
Dina Titus (NV-1)
Ann Kuster (NH-2)
Josh Gottheimer (NJ-5)
Donald Norcross (NJ-1)
Frank Pallone (NJ-6)
Bill Pascrell (NJ-9)
Donald Payne Jr. (NJ-10)
Albio Sires (NJ-8) Retiring at end of current Congress.
Bonnie Watson Coleman (NJ-12)
Yvette Clarke (NY-9)
Brian Higgins (NY-26)
Carolyn Maloney (NY-12) Lost renomination in 2022 due to redistricting.
Sean Patrick Maloney (NY-18) Lost re-election in 2022
Jerry Nadler (NY-10)
Elise Stefanik (NY-21) 
Paul Tonko (NY-20)
Nydia Velázquez (NY-7)
Alma Adams (NC-12)
G.K. Butterfield (NC-1) Retiring at end of current Congress.
David Price (NC-4) Retiring at end of current Congress.
Gregorio Sablan (NMI- At large)
Bill Johnson (OH-6)
Marcy Kaptur (OH-9)
Tim Ryan (OH-13) Retiring at end of current Congress.
Earl Blumenauer (OR-3)
Suzanne Bonamici (OR-1)
Peter DeFazio (OR-4) Retiring at end of current Congress.
Kurt Schrader (OR-5) Lost renomination in Democratic primary.
Brendan Boyle (PA-2)
Michael Doyle (PA-14) Retiring at end of current Congress.
Glenn Thompson (PA-15)
David Cicilline (RI-1)
James Langevin (RI-2) Retiring at end of current Congress.
James Clyburn (SC-6)
Joe Wilson (SC-2)
Steve Cohen (TN-9)
Jim Cooper (TN-5) Retiring at end of current Congress.
Lloyd Doggett (TX-35)
Vicente Gonzalez (TX-15)
Kay Granger (TX-12)
Al Green (TX-9)
Sheila Jackson-Lee (TX-18)
Eddie Bernice Johnson (TX-30) Retiring at end of current Congress.
Marc Veasey (TX-33)
Peter Welch (VT-At large) Retiring at end of current Congress.
Don Beyer (VA-8)
Gerry Connolly (VA-11)
Robert Scott (VA-3)
Suzan DelBene (WA-1)
Derek Kilmer (WA-6)
Rick Larsen (WA-2)
Adam Smith (WA-9)
David McKinley (WV-1) Lost renomination in Republican primary.
Ron Kind (WI-3) Retiring at end of current Congress.
Mark Pocan (WI-2)

Former members

Ann Kirkpatrick (AZ-1) – Retired in 2016 to seek a U.S. Senate seat, returned to the House in 2018 but did not rejoin caucus.
Kyrsten Sinema (AZ-9) – Retired in 2018 to successfully seek a U.S. Senate seat.
Lois Capps (CA-24) – Retired from the House in 2016.
Susan Davis (CA-53) - Retired from the House in 2020.
Sam Farr (CA-20) – Retired from the House in 2016.
Mike Honda (CA-17) – Lost re-election in 2016.
Duncan D. Hunter (CA-50) – Resigned from the House in 2020.
Loretta Sanchez (CA-46) – Retired in 2016 to seek a U.S. Senate seat.
Mike Coffman (CO-6) – Lost re-election in 2018.
Jared Polis (CO-2) – Retired in 2018 to successfully run for Governor of Colorado.
Elizabeth Esty (CT-5) – Retired from the House in 2018.
Corrine Brown (FL-5) – Lost renomination in the 2016 Democratic primary.
Alcee Hastings (FL-20) - Died in office in 2021.
Patrick Murphy (FL-18) – Retired in 2016 to seek a U.S. Senate seat.
Alan Grayson (FL-9) – Retired in 2016 to seek a U.S. Senate seat.
Tom Rooney (FL-17) – Retired from the House in 2018.
Ileana Ros-Lehtinen (FL-27) – Retired from the House in 2018.
John Lewis (GA-5) – Died in office in 2020.
Robert Dold (IL-10) – Lost re-election in 2016.
Luis Gutierrez (IL-4) – Retired from the House in 2018.
Dan Lipinski (IL-3) - Retired from the House in 2020.
Pete Visclosky (IN-1) - Retired from the House in 2020.
David Loebsack (IA-2) - Retired from the House in 2020.
Lynn Jenkins (KS-2) – Retired from the House in 2018.
John Fleming (LA-4) – Retired in 2016 to seek a U.S. senate seat.
Elijah Cummings (MD-7) – Died in office in 2019.
John Delaney (MD-6) – Retired in 2018 to run for President of the United States.
Donna Edwards (MD-4) – Retired in 2016 to seek a U.S. Senate seat.
Chris Van Hollen (MD-8) – Retired in 2016 to successfully seek a U.S. Senate seat.
Michael Capuano (MA-7) – Lost renomination in the 2018 Democratic primary.
Niki Tsongas (MA-3) – Retired from the House in 2018.
John Conyers (MI-13) – Resigned from the House in 2017.
Sander Levin (MI-9) – Retired from the House in 2018.
Keith Ellison (MN-5) – Retired in 2018 to successfully run for Attorney General of Minnesota.
Rick Nolan (MN-8) – Retired from the House in 2018.
Erik Paulsen (MN-3) – Lost re-election in 2018.
Collin Peterson (MN-7) - Lost re-election in 2020.
Tim Walz (MN-1) – Retired in 2018 to successfully run for Governor of Minnesota.
Gregg Harper (MS-3) – Retired from the House in 2018.
William Lacy Clay (MO-1) - Lost renomination in the 2020 Democratic primary.
Brad Ashford (NE-2) – Lost re-election in 2016.
Carol Shea-Porter (NH-1) – Retired from the House in 2018.
Leonard Lance (NJ-7) – Lost re-election in 2018.
Frank LoBiondo (NJ-2) – Retired from the House in 2018.
Ben Ray Lujan (NM-3) - Retired in 2020 to successfully seek a U.S. Senate seat.
Antonio Delgado (NY-19) - Resigned in 2022 to become Lieutenant Governor of New York.
Eliot Engel (NY-16) - Lost renomination in the 2020 Democratic primary.
Steve Israel (NY-3) – Retired from the House in 2016.
Nita Lowey (NY-17) - Retired from the House in 2020.
Charles Rangel (NY-13) – Retired from the House in 2016.
Jose Serrano (NY-15) - Retired from the House in 2020. 
Louise Slaughter (NY-25) – Died in office in 2018.
Marcia Fudge (OH-11) - Resigned in 2021 to become U.S. Secretary of Housing and Urban Development.
Steve Stivers (OH-15) - Resigned in 2021 to become President and CEO of the Ohio Chamber of Commerce.
Betty Sutton (OH-13) – Lost re-election in 2012.
Kendra Horn (OK-5) - Lost re-election in 2020.
Bob Brady (PA-1) – Retired from the House in 2018.
Charlie Dent (PA-15) – Resigned from the House in 2018.
Brian Fitzpatrick (PA-8) – Left caucus, still serving in the House.
Tim Murphy (PA-18) – Resigned from the House in 2017.
Pedro Pierluisi (PR-At large) – Retired from the House in 2016.
Kristi Noem (SD-At Large) – Retired in 2018 to successfully run for Governor of South Dakota.
Phil Roe (TN-1) - Retired from the House in 2020.
Gene Green (TX-29) – Retired from the House in 2018.
Pete Olson (TX-22) - Retired from the House in 2020.
Beto O'Rourke (TX-16) – Retired in 2018 to seek a U.S. Senate seat.
Lamar Smith (TX-21) – Retired from the House in 2018.
Jason Chaffetz (UT-3) – Retired from the House in 2018.
Barbara Comstock (VA-10) – Lost re-election in 2018.
Denny Heck (WA-10) - Retired in 2020 to successfully run for Lieutenant Governor of Washington. 
Jim McDermott (WA-7) – Retired from the House in 2016.
Dave Reichert (WA-8) – Retired from the House in 2018.
Evan Jenkins (WV-3) – Resigned from the House in 2018.
Reid Ribble (WI-8) – Retired from the House in 2016.
Cynthia Lummis (WY-At Large) – Retired from the House in 2016.

Last updated: May 31, 2022

References 

Civic and political organizations of the United States
Caucuses of the United States Congress